Hughes Airport may refer to:

 Hughes Airport (Alaska), an active airport in Hughes, Alaska, United States (IATA: HUS)
 Hughes Airport (California), a former airport in Los Angeles, California, United States (IATA: CVR)